Tin El Koum (also written Tin Alkoum) is a village in the commune of Djanet, in Djanet District, Illizi Province, Algeria. It is located in the same valley as Ghat in Libya, deep within in the south-eastern Tassili N'Ajjer mountain range, east of Djanet. It is the location of a border crossing into Libya which is controlled by independent Tuareg militias in the Libyan civil war.

References

Neighbouring towns and cities

Algeria–Libya border crossings